Monclar is the name or part of the name of the following communes in France:

 Monclar, Gers, in the Gers department
 Monclar, Lot-et-Garonne, in the Lot-et-Garonne department
 Monclar-de-Quercy, in the Tarn-et-Garonne department
 Monclar-sur-Losse, in the Gers department